Iridomyrmex reburrus is a species of ant in the genus Iridomyrmex. Described by Shattuck in 1993, the species is endemic to the northern regions of Australia.

References

External links

Iridomyrmex
Hymenoptera of Australia
Insects described in 1993